Welgelegen is a resort in Suriname, located in the Paramaribo District.  Its population at the 2012 census was 19,304.

References

Resorts of Suriname
Populated places in Paramaribo District